John Stewart-Murray may refer to:
 John Stewart-Murray, 8th Duke of Atholl, British soldier and Unionist politician
 John Stewart-Murray, 7th Duke of Atholl, Scottish peer